Watford Grammar School may refer to:
Watford Grammar School for Boys
Watford Grammar School for Girls